Panicum rigidum is a species of grass in the family Poaceae. It is endemic to the East African island of Socotra, a political territory of Western Asian Yemen. Its natural habitats are subtropical or tropical dry shrubland and rocky areas.

References

rigidum
Endemic flora of Socotra
Grasses of Africa
Flora of Yemen
Least concern plants
Taxonomy articles created by Polbot
Taxa named by Isaac Bayley Balfour